The Chief of Naval Staff (CNS) is the military head and highest ranking military officer of the Nigerian Navy. The Chief of Naval Staff is usually the highest ranking and most senior admiral to serve in the Nigerian Armed Forces unless the Chief of the Defence Staff is a naval officer.
The position is often occupied by the most senior commissioned officer appointed by the Commander-in-Chief of the Armed Forces of Nigeria. The Chief of Naval Staff reports to the Chief of Defence Staff, who also reports to the Defence Minister.
The Statutory duty of the Officer is to formulate and execute policies towards the highest attainment of National Security and operational competence of the Nigerian Navy.

The current Chief of Naval Staff is Vice Admiral Awwal Zubairu Gambo who was appointed on 26 January 2021 by President Muhammadu Buhari to succeed Ibok Ekwe Ibas.

Chiefs of Naval Staff
Table below is a chronological list of officers holding the position of Chief of Naval Staff (CNS).

References

Nigerian Navy admirals
Nigeria
Nigerian military appointments